Deborah Harry Collection is a compilation album of recordings by Deborah Harry, released by Dutch budget price label Disky Communications in 1998.

Deborah Harry Collection was re-issued with new artwork by EMI's mid-price label EMI Gold under the title French Kissin' - The Collection in 2004.

Track listing

References

Debbie Harry albums
1998 compilation albums